Jordan Alexa Jackson (born September 19, 1990) is an American soccer player from Overland Park, Kansas. She last played for Houston Dash of the National Women's Soccer League in 2015.

Early life
Jackson was born on September 19, 1990 in Overland Park, Kansas.

Jackson played high school soccer at Blue Valley West High School, where she was a four-year starter and a high school All-American her senior year. Jackson played club soccer for the KCFC Alliance Jazz.

Collegiate career
Jackson attended the University of Nebraska where she played as a forward and midfielder for the Cornhuskers. Jackson scored 35 goals and had 31 assists in 85 appearances for the Cornhuskers.

Playing career

Club

Houston Dash, 2014–2015
Jackson was selected in the fourth round of the National Women's Soccer League college entry draft by the Houston Dash.

Jackson scored her first professional goal against FC Kansas City

She was waived by the Houston Dash in October 2015.

International
Jackson has appeared with the United States national U-20 soccer team and is currently part of the United States U-23 women's national team player pool.

Awards and honors

Individual 

 Big Ten Midfielder of the Year: 2013
 First Team All-Big Ten: 2013
 Second Team NSCAA All-Great Lakes Region: 2013
 Big Ten All-Tournament Team: 2013
 First Team All-Big 12: 2010

See also

References

External links 
 Houston Dash player profile
 Nebraska player profile
 

1990 births
Living people
National Women's Soccer League players
Houston Dash players
Nebraska Cornhuskers women's soccer players
American women's soccer players
Houston Dash draft picks
Women's association football midfielders